The Shanghai–Wuhan–Chengdu high-speed railway is a high-speed rail line under construction in China. The Chinese name of the railway line, Huyurong, is a combination of the abbreviations for Shanghai, Chongqing, and Chengdu. It will run in an east-west direction largely parallel to the Yangtze River, connecting the cities of Shanghai, Nanjing, Hefei, Wuhan, Chongqing and Chengdu.

Announced in 2016 as part of the national "eight vertical and eight horizontal" high-speed railway network, the passage will comprise multiple railway lines and branch lines, including those currently operational as well as those under construction and under planning.

Route 

The railway's route is roughly parallel to the existing Shanghai–Wuhan–Chengdu passenger railway, but has a maximum speed of  rather than the older line's . The new line would provide a faster connection for the cities of Shanghai, Nanjing, Hefei, Wuhan, Chongqing and Chengdu.

The line includes a number of interconnected routes, including two different main routes between Shanghai and Hefei, a more direct southerly route via Huzhou and a Yangtze north bank route. Yichang North will also eventually be a junction with the Hohhot–Nanning corridor.

Sections
Initially using a large number of existing lines, the final line is shown in bold
Status：、、

References

See also 
 High-speed rail in China

High-speed rail in China